Moriyoshi may refer to:

 Prince Moriyoshi, Japanese prince and monk
 Moriyoshi, Akita, a town located in Kitaakita District, Akita Prefecture, Japan
 Moriyoshi Express, a railway service provided by Akita Nairiku Line